Wu Chien-ch'uan or Wu Jianquan (1870–1942) was a famous teacher and founder of the neijia martial art of Wu-style t'ai chi ch'uan in late Imperial and early Republican China.

Biography
Wu Chien-ch'uan was taught martial arts by his father, Wu Ch'uan-yu, a senior student of Yang Luchan, and Yang Pan-hou. Both Wu Chien-ch'uan and his father were hereditary Manchu cavalry officers of the Yellow Banner as well as the Imperial Guards Brigade, yet the Wu family were to become patriotic supporters of Sun Yat-sen.

At the time of the establishment of the Chinese Republic in 1912, China was in turmoil, besieged for many years economically and even militarily by several foreign powers, so Wu Chien-ch'uan and his colleagues Yang Shao-hou, Yang Chengfu and Sun Lu-t'ang promoted the benefits of t'ai chi ch'uan training on a national scale. They subsequently offered classes at the Beijing Physical Culture Research Institute to as many people as possible, starting in 1914. It was the first school to provide instruction in the art to the general public. Wu Chien-ch'uan was also asked to teach the Eleventh Corps of the new Presidential Bodyguard as well as at the nationally famous Ching Wu martial arts school.

As the focus of t'ai chi ch'uan teaching in his time changed from a strictly military art to a discipline made available to the general public, Wu Chien-ch'uan modified the teaching forms he learned from his father somewhat. Wu Chien-ch'uan's changes to the initial forms shown to his students included smoothing overt expressions of fa chin, jumps and other abrupt time changes in the training routines in order to make those forms easier for the general public to learn. These modified elements were preserved and taught in various advanced forms and pushing hands, however.

Wu Chien-ch'uan moved his family to Shanghai in 1928. In 1935, he established the Chien-ch'uan T'ai Chi Ch'uan Association (鑑泉太極拳社) on the ninth floor of the Shanghai YMCA to promote and teach t'ai chi ch'uan. What he taught has since become known as Wu-style t'ai chi ch'uan and is one of the five primary styles practised around the world, the others being Chen-style t'ai chi ch'uan, Yang-style t'ai chi ch'uan, Wu (Hao)-style t'ai chi ch'uan and Sun-style t'ai chi ch'uan.

The Chien-ch'uan T'ai Chi Ch'uan Association schools have subsequently been maintained by Wu Chien-ch'uan's descendants. He was succeeded as head of the Wu family system by his oldest son, Wu Kung-i, in 1942. His second son, Wu Kung-tsao, also became a renowned t'ai chi ch'uan master. Wu Kung-i moved the family headquarters to the Hong Kong school (established in 1937) in 1949. Today the Association still has its international headquarters in Hong Kong and is currently managed by Wu Chien-ch'uan's great-grandson, Wu Kuang-yu, with branches in Shanghai, Singapore, Canada, the United States, the United Kingdom, Greece, Tahiti, and France.

Several of Wu's disciples also became well known t'ai chi teachers. Prominent in that number were the senior disciple, Ma Yueh-liang, Wu T'u-nan and Cheng Wing-kwong. His daughter Wu Yinghua and her husband Ma Yueh-liang continued running the Shanghai Chien-ch'uan T'ai Chi Ch'uan Association until their deaths in the mid 1990s.

T'ai chi ch'uan lineage tree with Wu-style focus

References

External links
 International Wu Style Tai Chi Chuan Federation website
 Forum for Traditional Wu Tai Chi Chuan, Europe, South Africa and Japan
 Detroit, Michigan Wu style website
 UK website for Ma Jiangbao tai chi (son of Wu Yinhua)

1870 births
1942 deaths
Chinese tai chi practitioners
Manchu martial artists
Martial arts school founders
Chinese military officers